Jacques Nicolaou (7 October 1930 – 30 May 2022) was a French comic book author.

Biography
He then took over for José Cabrero Arnal in illustrating  and worked for Pif Gadget, Dimanche Fillette, and Les Rois du Rire. After his retirement, he began to work with watercolors while returning to Placid et Muzo on occasion.

Nicolaou died on 30 May 2022, at the age of 91.

References

1930 births
2022 deaths
French comics artists
People from Châtenay-Malabry